This article lists the official squads for the 2017 Women's Rugby League World Cup.

Pool A

Australia 
Head coach:  Brad Donald

 Sam Bremner (Helensburgh Tiger Lillies, NSW) was selected but did not play due to injury.

Cook Islands 
Head coach:  Ian Bourke

 Ruahei Demant (Auckland, NZ) was selected but did not play.

England 
Head coach:  Chris Chapman

 Rachel Thompson (Thatto Heath - St Helens), Rhiannon Marshall (Featherstone Rovers) and Stacey White (Bradford Bulls) were selected in the squad but did not play in the tournament

Pool B

Canada 
Head coach:  Mike Castle

 Petra Woods (Ontario) was selected but did not play in the tournament.

New Zealand 
Head coach:  Tony Benson

Papua New Guinea 
Head coach:  Dennis Miall
 Elvina Aaron (Southern)
 Helen Abau   (Southern)
 Delilah Ahose (Southern)
 Della Audama (Southern)
 Akosita Baru (Northern)
 Christie Bulhage (Highlands)
 Brenda Goro (Southern)
 Carol Humeu (Southern)
 Shirley Joe (Northern)
 Martha Karl (Northern)
 Gloria Kaupa (Highlands)
 Naomi Kaupa (Southern)
 Amelia Kuk (Brothers Ipswich, QLD)
 Joan Kuman (Southern)
 Grace Mark (Northern)
 Mala Mark  (Highlands)
 Janet Michael (Southern)
 Cathy Neap (C) (Southern)
 Anne Ouifa  (Highlands)
 Vanessa Palme (Southern)
 Fay Sogave  (Higlands)
 Jazmyn Taumafai (Caboolture Sharks, QLD)
 Vero Waula (Southern)
 Maima Wei  (Southern)

References 

Women's Rugby League World Cup
Rugby League World Cup squads
World Cup